Laidlaw College (previously known as the Bible College of New Zealand) is the largest theological college in New Zealand. The college offers tertiary courses in biblical, theological, historical and pastoral studies, as well as professional degrees in teaching and counselling. Laidlaw has around 1,000 students and offers programmes at Certificate, Diploma, Bachelors and Masters levels, as well as doctoral supervision. It is the highest ranked non-University research institute in New Zealand.

The college operates two campuses in Auckland (Henderson and Manukau) and one in Christchurch, and offers theology and biblical studies courses by distance. Laidlaw College has also established key partnerships with a number of colleges and churches in Aotearoa New Zealand.

The College's vision statement is: A world shaped by love, compelled and informed by the Gospel.

Its mission statement is: To equip students and scholars to renew their communities with a faith as intelligent as it is courageous.

History
The college began in 1922 as the Bible Training Institute (BTI) under the leadership of Rev. Joseph Kemp, a Baptist preacher and pastor of the Auckland Baptist Tabernacle. In 1972 the Institute was renamed the Bible College of New Zealand (BCNZ). In June 2008, BCNZ announced it had merged with MASTERS Institute, a school of education for training primary school teachers. In August 2008, the enlarged college was renamed Laidlaw College'' in honour of Robert Laidlaw, a founding trustee and longstanding President of the College.

See also
Christianity in New Zealand
Education in New Zealand

References

External links
Laidlaw College

Seminaries and theological colleges in New Zealand
Bible colleges
Evangelical seminaries and theological colleges
Educational institutions established in 1922
Education in Auckland
Christianity in Auckland
Australian College of Theology
1922 establishments in New Zealand